Terrell County is a county in the U.S. state of Texas. As of the 2020 census, its population was 760, making it the seventh-least populous county in Texas, and the 37th-least populous county in the nation. Its county seat is the census-designated place of Sanderson;  no incorporated municipalities are in the county. The county was named for Alexander W. Terrell, a Texas state senator. Terrell County is one of the nine counties in the Trans-Pecos region of West Texas. It is the setting for Cormac McCarthy's novel No Country for Old Men, and the Academy Award-winning film adaptation of the same name.

History

Native Americans
Evidence of the indigenous peoples of Terrell County are found on the county's various ranches – arrowheads, tools, burned-rock middens, caves, and shelters containing Indian pictographs.  Pieces of reed sandals, baskets, and evidence of burials have been found in the caves. The most pictographs are on cliff walls above Myers Spring near Dryden, overpainting giving to the theory that several Indian cultures were involved.

Early exploration
Capt. José de Berroterán in 1729 commanded an expedition on behalf of Spain to explore from Mission San Juan Bautista up the Rio Grande to the mouth of the Rio Conchos. Berroterán crossed the southern border, where at a spring near Dryden, legend has it that he placed a large wooden cross. Six years later, another Spaniard, Blas María de la Garza Falcón, found the cross while conducting an expedition in the area and named the spot Santa Cruz de Maya. Captain Samuel Highsmith, under the command of John Coffee Hays, crossed the county in 1848 in an ill-fated expedition to open a road from San Antonio to El Paso.
In 1851 Army officer and geographer Lt. Nathaniel Michler, working under Major William H. Emory, mapped this portion of the boundary between Mexico and the United States. Under Lt. William Echols in 1859, caravans of the U.S. Camel Corps crossed the county searching for a shorter route to Fort Davis.

County established and growth
In 1905, Terrell County was created by the Texas Legislature by carving about  out of Pecos County. It was organized the same year. Sanderson became the county seat.  In 1881, Texas and New Orleans Railroad surveyors reached the site of present-day Sanderson. Originally named Strawbridge by founder Cyrus W. “Charley” Wilson, the name was later changed in honor of railroad Engineer Joseph P. Sanderson. Charles Downie, a Scot, homesteaded in 1881 and became the first permanent sheepman in the area. Together, the railroad, cattle, and sheep industries were the major economic assets. Ranges were still unfenced. Dryden became a large shipping point for cattle ranchers. Terrell County became one of the biggest sheep and wool producers in the U.S. In 1926, 11,000 lambs averaging $6 per head were sold in one of the largest lamb sales in history. Thousands of pounds of wool and mohair were sold annually through the Sanderson Wool Commission.   Dryden, the only town besides Sanderson in the county, was also started in 1882, but is now a ghost town. Judge Roy Bean is said to have operated a saloon at Sanderson. The oil and gas industry became increasingly important to Terrell County's economy after 1957, when the Brown-Bassett gas field was discovered in the northeast part of the county. Only gas was produced until the 1970s, when high petroleum prices encouraged limited oil production, as well.
Sanderson was struck by a flood on June 11, 1965, in which 28 people died. Two of them were never found. The Texas State Senate Concurrent Resolution No. 1, 76th Legislature, Regular Session               (1999) declared Sanderson and Terrell County the "Cactus Capital of Texas."

Geography

Major highways
  U.S. Highway 90
  U.S. Highway 285
  State Highway 349

Adjacent counties and municipios
 Pecos County (north)
 Crockett County (north)
 Val Verde County (east)
 Brewster County (southwest)
 Acuña, Coahuila, Mexico (south)

National protected area
 Rio Grande Wild and Scenic River (part)

Climate

Most of Terrell County consists of semiarid steppes with 85.7% of the county's area described as having a hot steppe climate (Köppen BSh) and 2.6% having a cold steppe climate (Köppen BSk). The remaining 11.7% of the county experiences a hot arid desert climate (Köppen BWh).

Dryden

 Coordinates: 
 Elevation: 

Sanderson

 Coordinates: 
 Elevation:

Demographics

Note: the US Census treats Hispanic/Latino as an ethnic category. This table excludes Latinos from the racial categories and assigns them to a separate category. Hispanics/Latinos can be of any race.

As of the census of 2010, 984 people, 443 households, and 295 families resided in the county. The population density was less than 1/km2 (1/sq mi). The 991 housing units averaged less than 1 per square mile (0/km2). About 84.1% of the population were White, 0.9% Native American, 0.7% Black or African American, 0.4% Asian, 12.3% of some other race and 1.5% of two or more races; 47.5% were Hispanic or Latino (of any race).

Of the 443 households, 29.80% had children under the age of 18 living with them, 54.40% were married couples living together, 7.40% had a female householder with no husband present, and 33.40% were not families. About 31.80% of all households were made up of individuals, and 16.30% had someone living alone who was 65 years of age or older. The average household size was 2.44 and the average family size was 3.09.

In the county, the population was distributed as 26.50% under the age of 18, 5.00% from 18 to 24, 23.40% from 25 to 44, 27.50% from 45 to 64, and 17.60% who were 65 years of age or older. The median age was 42 years. For every 100 females, there were 103.20 males. For every 100 females age 18 and over, there were 101.50 males.

The median income for a household in the county was $24,219, and for a family was $28,906. Males had a median income of $21,429 versus $15,804 for females. The per capita income for the county was $13,721. About 21.20% of families and 25.20% of the population were below the poverty line, including 31.40% of those under age 18 and 31.10% of those age 65 or over.

Communities
 Cedar Station
 Dryden
 Sanderson (county seat)

Politics

See also

 National Register of Historic Places listings in Terrell County, Texas
 Recorded Texas Historic Landmarks in Terrell County
 USS Terrell County (LST-1157)

References

External links
 Terrell County government’s website
 
 Entry for Alexander Watkins Terrell from the Biographical Encyclopedia of Texas published 1880, hosted by the Portal to Texas History.

 
1905 establishments in Texas
Populated places established in 1905
Trans-Pecos
Majority-minority counties in Texas